The 2011 Kazan Kremlin Cup was a professional tennis tournament played on indoor hard courts. It was the second edition of the tournament which was part of the 2011 ATP Challenger Tour and the Tretorn SERIE+ series. It took place in Kazan, Russia between 31 January and 6 February 2011.

ATP entrants

Seeds

 Rankings are as of January 17, 2011.

Other entrants
The following players received wildcards into the singles main draw:
  Victor Baluda
  Anton Manegin
  Vaja Uzakov
  Daniyal Zagidullin

The following players received entry from the qualifying draw:
  Aliaksandr Bury
  Mikhail Ledovskikh
  Deniss Pavlovs
  Alexander Rumyantsev

Champions

Singles

 Marius Copil def.  Andreas Beck, 6–4, 6–4

Doubles

 Yves Allegro /  Andreas Beck def.  Mikhail Elgin /  Alexander Kudryavtsev, 6–4, 6–4

References

External links
Official Website
ITF Search 
ATP official site

2011 ATP Challenger Tour
2011 in Russian tennis
2011
2011 Kazan Kremlin Cup
January 2011 sports events in Russia
February 2011 sports events in Russia